Lim Chang-Gyoon (born 19 April 1990) is a South Korean footballer who plays as midfielder for Chiangmai in Thai League 2.

Career

Bucheon FC 1995
He was selected by Bucheon FC in 2013 K League Draft. He scored his debut goal on March 23 against Goyang Hi FC. During the season, he caps 32 games with 5 goals and 7 assists.

Gyeongnam FC
After 2013 season, he moved to Gyeongnam FC which is one of the K-League Classic teams.

Seongnam FC
In 2016 summer, he moved to Seongnam FC

References

External links 

1990 births
Living people
Association football midfielders
South Korean footballers
Bucheon FC 1995 players
Gyeongnam FC players
Suwon FC players
Asan Mugunghwa FC players
Lim Chang-gyoon
Lim Chang-gyoon
Lim Chang-gyoon
K League 2 players
K League 1 players